Kathleen Fleur Anderson (born 6 February 1971) the Member of Parliament (MP) for Putney, elected in 2019. A member of the Labour Party, she has been Shadow Paymaster General since 2021 and was a member of Wandsworth London Borough Council from 2014 to 2021.

Early life and education
Anderson was born on the Channel island of Jersey. She graduated with a Bachelor of Science degree in Politics from the University of York in 1993. She was a member of the Liberal Democrats at university, standing as an independent when running for president of the Students Union, holding that post in 1994. In 2007, she attended the Open University for a Master of Science degree in Global Development Management, awarded in 2010.

Career

International development and advocacy
Anderson began her career in development and environmental and poverty campaigns, both in London and abroad. She worked for Christian Aid from 1994 to 1997, taking on roles as a campaign assistant in London, working in Serbia during the war and as Head of Country Office in Bosnia in the aftermath of the Bosnian War. From 1997 to 1999 she was Head of World Action for the Methodist youth organisation MAYC, leading campaigns on bullying, Burma and International Debt cancellation. She then worked for CAFOD in London as Head of Campaigns and Advocacy Strategy Manager. Here she co-founded the Trade Justice Campaign. From 2003 to 2006 she was a trustee of the Jubilee Debt Campaign. During her time as a freelance consultant in Kenya from 2007 to 2010, she worked on several successful campaigns on water and urban nutrition, working with organisations such as End Water Poverty and Oxfam, as well as helping to establish grassroots organisations such as the Shalom Centre for Conflict Resolution and Reconciliation. Upon returning to London, Anderson joined WaterAid as Head of Global Campaigns.

Politics
Anderson decided to get involved in politics in response to the closing of children's centres and local institutions. She was elected to represent Bedford Ward on Wandsworth London Borough Council in 2014, alongside Rosena Allin-Khan, and re-elected in 2018. Anderson was the Labour Spokesperson for Community Services and the Environment from 2015 to 2018 and the Deputy Leader of Wandsworth Labour Group from 2016 to 2018. She co-founded Wandsworth Welcomes Refugees and was the Head of Community Services for the Katherine Low Settlement, a community centre in Battersea from 2016 to 2020. Locally, she campaigned for the 20 mph speed limit, against the closure of children's centres, and against cutting the Autism Advisory Service.

Anderson supported a second Brexit referendum, which she said was "the route to bringing the country back together."

Anderson was elected MP for Putney on 12 December 2019. On a night in which Labour suffered its worst electoral defeat since 1935, Putney was the only Labour gain.

Anderson made her maiden speech on 9 January 2020. She backed Keir Starmer and Rosena Allin-Khan in the 2020 Labour leadership and deputy leadership elections.

On 7 January 2021, Anderson was promoted from Parliamentary Private Secretary to Preet Gill as Shadow Secretary of State for International Development to replace Helen Hayes as a Shadow Minister for the Cabinet under Rachel Reeves due to Hayes resigning over Labour's support for the European Union (Future Relationship) Act 2020. In December 2021, she was promoted within the shadow Cabinet Office team to serve as Shadow Paymaster General.

References

External links

1971 births
21st-century British women politicians
Alumni of the Open University
Alumni of the University of York
British environmentalists
Councillors in the London Borough of Wandsworth
Female members of the Parliament of the United Kingdom for English constituencies
Jersey women in politics
Labour Party (UK) MPs for English constituencies
Labour Party (UK) councillors
Living people
UK MPs 2019–present
Women councillors in England